Women's double sculls competition at the 2008 Summer Olympics in Beijing was held between August 9 and 16 at the Shunyi Olympic Rowing-Canoeing Park.

This rowing event is a double scull event, meaning that each boat is propelled by a pair of rowers. The "scull" portion means that each rower uses two oars, one on each side of the boat; this contrasts with sweep rowing in which each rower has one oar and rows on only one side. The competition consists of multiple rounds. Finals were held to determine the placing of each boat; these finals were given letters with those nearer to the beginning of the alphabet meaning a better ranking.

During the first round two heats were held. The top boat in each heat advanced directly to the A final, with all others going to the repechage. The two repechage heats filled out the rest of the finals, with the best two boats in each repechage heat advancing to the A final and the remaining two boats in each repechage going to the B final.

Each final determined a set of rankings. The A final determined the medals, along with the rest of the places through 6th. The B final gave the rest of the rankings, through 10th place.

In the A Final, Georgina and Caroline Evers-Swindell of New Zealand defended their double sculls gold medal from the 2004 Summer Olympics in a highly competitive race which saw them beat the German crew by just 1/100 of a second (7:07.32 versus 7:07.33), and the third-placing British crew by just 0.23 seconds. This was the first time in Olympic history that the Women's Double Sculls title had been successfully defended.

Schedule
All times are China Standard Time (UTC+8)

Results

Heats
Qualification Rules: 1->FA, 2..->R

Heat 1

Heat 2

Repechages
Qualification Rules: 1-2>FA, 3..->FB

Repechage 1

Repechage 2

Final B

Final A

References

External links
NYT Olympic Report

Rowing at the 2008 Summer Olympics
Women's rowing at the 2008 Summer Olympics
Women's events at the 2008 Summer Olympics